Greenleaf is a Swedish rock band created as a side project in late 1999 by Tommi Holappa (Dozer), Daniel Lidén (Demon Cleaner) and Bengt Bäcke (record producer/studio engineer; Dozer, Demon Cleaner, Lowrider). In 2003, Lidén joined Dozer, making three of the four Dozers members also members of Greenleaf, so the band took a back seat until 2007.

Discography
Greenleaf EP (2000) – Molten Universe
Peder Bergstrand (Lowrider) – vocals
Daniel Lidén – drums
Tommi Holappa – guitar
Bengt Bäcke – bass
(Review:
Stonerrock.com)

Revolution Rock (2001) – Molten Universe
Fredrik Nordin (Dozer) – vocals
Daniel Lidén – drums
Tommi Holappa – guita
Bengt Bäcke – bass
(Review: Stonerrock.com)

Secret Alphabets (2003) – Small Stone Records
Fredrik Nordin – vocals
Daniel Lidén – drums
Daniel Jansson (Demon Cleaner) – guitars
Tommi Holappa – guitar
Bengt Bäcke – bass
(Reviews:
Stonerrock.com
Hellride Music
Musiq
[ Eduardo Rivadavia, Allmusic])

Agents of Ahriman (2007) – Small Stone Records
Oskar Cedermalm (Truckfighters) – vocals
Erik Bäckwall (ex-Dozer) – drums
Tommi Holappa – guitar
Bengt Bäcke – bass
Jocke Ahslund – keyboards
(Reviews:
Aural Innovations
Metal Rules
[ Eduardo Rivadavia, Allmusic])

Nest of Vipers (2012) – Small Stone Records
Oskar Cedermalm – vocals
Olle Mårthans – drums
Johan Rockner – guitar
Tommi Holappa – guitar
Bengt Bäcke – bass

Trails & Passes (2014) – Small Stone Records
Arvid Jonsson – vocals
Sebastian Olsson – drums
Tommi Holappa – guitar
Bengt Bäcke – bass
(Reviews:
The Evil Engineer)

Rise Above the Meadow (2016) – Napalm Records
Arvid Jonsson – vocals
Sebastian "Kongo" Olsson – drums
Tommi Holappa – guitar
Johan Rockner – bass

Hear the Rivers (2018) – Napalm Records
Tommi Holappa – guitar
Sebastian Olsson – drums
Hans Fröhlich – bass
Arvid Hällagård – vocals

Echoes from a Mass (2021) – Napalm Records
Tommi Holappa – guitar
Sebastian Olsson – drums
Hans Fröhlich – bass
Arvid Hällagård – vocals
(Reviews:
Last Rites)

References

External links

Greenleaf on Facebook

Small Stone Records Biography
Interview with Tommi Holappa of Greenleaf

Swedish musical groups
Swedish stoner rock musical groups